The James Dixon Farm is a historic house located northwest of Boonton on Rockaway Valley Road, northeast of Valley Road, in Boonton Township of Morris County, New Jersey. It was built in 1760. It has also been known as the Aaron Miller House and as the Dixon Property. It was listed on the National Register of Historic Places in 1977.

See also
 National Register of Historic Places listings in Morris County, New Jersey

References

Boonton Township, New Jersey
Houses completed in 1760
Farms on the National Register of Historic Places in New Jersey
Houses in Morris County, New Jersey
National Register of Historic Places in Morris County, New Jersey
1760 establishments in New Jersey